Warwickshire County Council is the county council that governs the non-metropolitan county of Warwickshire in England.

Its headquarters are located at Shire Hall, Market Square, in centre of the county town of Warwick. Politically the county is divided into five districts and boroughs: North Warwickshire, Nuneaton and Bedworth, Rugby, Stratford and Warwick. The council's principal functions are county roads and rights of way, social services, education and libraries, but it also provides many other local government services in the area it covers.

History

Prior to 1974 and the creation of the West Midlands, the county was much larger, incorporating the town of Sutton Coldfield, the semi-rural area around Meriden, the town of Solihull, the city of Coventry and the city of Birmingham, although these last three areas were administratively independent of the pre-1974 county council as they had their own county borough councils.

Political composition

As of 2021, the Council has 57 elected members, made up of 42 Conservatives (the ruling group), 6 Labour, 5 Liberal Democrats, 3 Green, and 1 Whitnash Residents Association.

The current leader of the council is Conservative Izzi Seccombe and the Chief Executive is Monica Fogarty.

Historically since 1974, political control of the council has been composed of periods of no overall control alternated by periods of Conservative control:

References

 
County councils of England
1889 establishments in England
Local education authorities in England
Local authorities in Warwickshire
Major precepting authorities in England
Leader and cabinet executives